The Shilp Guru is the highest honour in the Indian handicrafts sector awarded by Development Commissioner (Handicrafts), Ministry of Textiles, Government of India. It is conferred annually upon 10 master craftspersons who have created an exceptional piece of craft work, showcased highest level of quality & skill in the traditional Indian handicrafts and passed on their skills to the next generation of artisans.

The awards were first introduced in 2002 where 10 eminent master craftpersons were honoured with Shilp Guru (master artisan) title by the President of India. It is presented along with Sant Kabir Awards and National Handicrafts Award to master craftspersons and master weavers, introduced in 1965. Most recent awards were presented on 28 November 2022 by the Vice President of India to 30 master craftspersons for the year 2017, 2018 and 2019. , the award consists of  prize money, a plaque, a gold coin, a shawl and a certificate.

Awardees

2008
The following is the list of the recipients of the Shilp Guru in 2008.

2009
The following is the list of the recipients of the Shilp Guru in 2009.

2010
The following is the list of the recipients of the Shilp Guru in 2010.

2012 
The following is the list of the recipients of the Shilp Guru in 2012.

2013 
The following is the list of the recipients of the Shilp Guru in 2013.

2014 
The following is the list of the recipients of the Shilp Guru in 2014.

2015
The following is the list of the recipients of the Shilp Guru in 2015.

2016
The following is the list of the recipients of the Shilp Guru in 2016.

2017 
The following is the list of the recipients of the Shilp Guru in 2017.

2018 
The following is the list of the recipients of the Shilp Guru in 2018.

2019 
The following is the list of the recipients of the Shilp Guru in 2019.

References

External links
Official website

Indian art awards
Indian handicrafts
Awards established in 2002
Ministry of Textiles
2002 establishments in India
Indian artisans